Carlton Lee Cooke (born July 12, 1944) is an American politician and businessman. He served as mayor of Austin, Texas from 1988 to 1991, being described by The Austin Chronicle as a "business-booster".

Education and career 
After initially attending the University of Hawaii, Cooke received a BA from Louisiana Tech University in 1966.

Cooke served as an Air Force intelligence officer during the Vietnam War and received the Bronze Star Medal. He is a former employee of the Texas Instruments from 1972 to 1983. Cooke served on Austin City Council for two terms from 1977 until 1981 leading the modern plan which revitalized downtown. Describing himself as a "conservative businessman", Cooke’s highlights included a new convention center, expansion by Motorola (NXP), IBM and AMD, the approval of 44 miles of freeway, refocus location of the airport to the closing Bergstrom AFB site and creation of the Austin Technology Incubator during his tenure as mayor.

He was President/CEO of the Greater Austin Chamber of Commerce from 1983 to 1987. During his tenure, a new strategy for a more diverse economy with emphasis on technology research, software development, music-film-conventions in addition to government, education and services was adopted.

References

1944 births
Living people
People from Marion, Alabama
Mayors of Austin, Texas
Louisiana Tech University alumni